The Frisco Thunder was an indoor football team in Frisco, Texas. They were members of the Intense Football League and played their home games at the Dr Pepper Arena.

The Thunder began play in the Intense Football League. As an expansion team, they made the playoffs and finished with a record of 8–6. Their second season was more disappointing, which ended with a 6–8 record and a first round playoff loss to the Odessa Roughnecks. The team also had the distinction of playing the first half of the 2008 season at home and the remaining seven games consecutively on the road due to construction on their home arena. 

For the 2009 season, the Intense Football League merged with United Indoor Football to create another version of the Indoor Football League. With construction continuing on Dr Pepper Arena into the 2009 season, the Thunder opted to sit the season out and did not participate in the 2009 IFL season. However, the team never returned for any other season.

The team was owned by former Minnesota Vikings and New Orleans Saints Jake Reed, who purchased the team during the 2007 season.

Season-by-season 

|-
| colspan="6" align="center" bgcolor="#2F4F2F" |  Frisco Thunder
|-
|2007 || 8 || 6 || 0 || Lost Semifinals || Corpus Christi 55, Frisco 41
|-
|2008 || 6 || 8 || 0 || Lost Round 1 || Odessa 67, Frisco 33
|-
!Totals || 14 || 16 || 0
|colspan="2"| (including playoffs)

External links
 Thunder's 2007 Stats
 Thunder's 2008 Stats

Defunct American football teams in Texas
Former Indoor Football League teams
Intense Football League teams
Sports in Frisco, Texas
American football teams in the Dallas–Fort Worth metroplex
American football teams established in 2006
American football teams disestablished in 2009
2006 establishments in Texas
2009 disestablishments in Texas